Nikolai Antonovich Mukho (December 6, 1913, Kronstadt, Saint Petersburg Governorate, Russian Empire – August 6, 1986, Leningrad, USSR) was a Soviet, Russian painter who lived and worked in Leningrad, and was regarded as a representative of the Leningrad school of painting. He was best known for his portraits.

Biography 
Mukho was born December 6, 1913, in Kronstadt, a seaport on Kotlin Island, 30 kilometers west of Saint Petersburg near the head of the Gulf of Finland.

From 1934–1940, he studied at Tavricheskaya Art School in Leningrad. After graduating in 1940, he entered the painting department of the Leningrad Institute of Painting, Sculpture and Architecture.

In August 1941, he was drafted into the Red Army and served in World War II, participating in the defense of Leningrad. After being wounded and demobilized in late 1943, he returned to the institute, where he studied with Mikhail Bernshtein, Semion Abugov, Alexander Zaytsev, Genrikh Pavlovsky, and Gleb Savinov.

In 1950 graduated from the institute. His graduation work was a genre painting, "The Leningrad Metro", dedicated to the builders of Leningrad's subway (whose first stations were opened in 1950).

From 1951 on, Mukho participated in art exhibitions, creating portraits, genre and historical compositions, seascapes, landscapes, and sketches from his life. In 1957 he was admitted to the Leningrad Union of Artists. He has a solo exhibition in Leningrad in 1989.

Mukho's work often portrayed the sea and the life of coastal cities. He worked in Yuzhno-Sakhalinsk, Murmansk, Sevastopol, Kronstadt, on the Northern Dvina. His work is distinguished by decorative, bright saturated colors, solid vigorously.

Mukho died on August 6, 1986 in Leningrad. His paintings are in art museums and private collections in Russia, France, England, the United States, Japan, and other countries.

See also
 Leningrad School of Painting
 List of painters of Saint Petersburg Union of Artists
 List of the Russian Landscape painters
 Saint Petersburg Union of Artists

References

Bibliography 
 Directory of members of the Leningrad branch of Union of Artists of Russian Federation. - Leningrad: Khudozhnik RSFSR, 1980. - p. 82.
 Sergei V. Ivanov. Unknown Socialist Realism. The Leningrad School. - Saint Petersburg: NP-Print Edition, 2007. – pp. 18, 27, 29, 156, 308, 365, 387, 388, 390, 391, 393-396, 398, 400, 403, 413-417, 419-422, 445. , .
 Anniversary Directory graduates of Saint Petersburg State Academic Institute of Painting, Sculpture, and Architecture named after Ilya Repin, Russian Academy of Arts. 1915–2005. - Saint Petersburg: Pervotsvet Publishing House, 2007. p. 63.

1913 births
1986 deaths
20th-century Russian painters
Russian male painters
Soviet painters
Socialist realist artists
Leningrad School artists
Repin Institute of Arts alumni
Members of the Leningrad Union of Artists
20th-century Russian male artists